The Valea Tocilelor (in its upper course: Tocila Mare) is a right tributary of the river Cibin in Romania. It discharges into the Cibin near Veștem.

References

Rivers of Romania
Rivers of Sibiu County